Gold Corporation is an Australian company owned by the Government of Western Australia, established by the Gold Corporation Act 1987, with a mandate to operate the Perth Mint, market Australian gold, and other related activities.

References 

Companies established in 1987
Government-owned companies of Western Australia